Yarmister is a genus of clown beetles in the family Histeridae. There are at least two described species in Yarmister.

Species
These two species belong to the genus Yarmister:
 Yarmister barberi Wenzel, 1939
 Yarmister emersoni Wenzel, 1944

References

Further reading

 
 

Histeridae
Articles created by Qbugbot